The 1981–82 season was the 71st season in Hajduk Split’s history and their 36th in the Yugoslav First League. Their 2nd place finish in the 1980–81 season meant it was their 36th successive season playing in the Yugoslav First League.

Competitions

Overall

Yugoslav First League

Classification

Results summary

Results by round

Matches

Yugoslav First League

Sources: hajduk.hr

Yugoslav Cup

Sources: hajduk.hr

UEFA Cup

Source: hajduk.hr

Player seasonal records

Top scorers

Source: Competitive matches

Notes
1. Match abandoned due to unknown reasons. Therefore, the match was awarded to Velež.

See also
1981–82 Yugoslav First League
1981–82 Yugoslav Cup

References

External sources
 1981–82 Yugoslav First League at rsssf.com
 1981–82 Yugoslav Cup at rsssf.com
 1981–82 UEFA Cup at rsssf.com

HNK Hajduk Split seasons
Hajduk Split